Kosmos 2393 ( meaning Cosmos 2393) is a Russian US-K missile early warning satellite which was launched in 2002 as part of the Russian Space Forces' Oko programme. The satellite is designed to identify missile launches using optical telescopes and infrared sensors.

Kosmos 2393 was launched from Site 16/2 at Plesetsk Cosmodrome in Russia. A Molniya-M carrier rocket with a 2BL upper stage was used to perform the launch, which took place at 12:20 UTC on 24 December 2002. The launch successfully placed the satellite into a molniya orbit. It subsequently received its Kosmos designation, and the international designator 2002-059A. The United States Space Command assigned it the Satellite Catalog Number 27613.

It stopped undertaking maneuvers to remain in its orbital position in February 2007 which probably indicates that it was not working from that date. It re-entered on December 22, 2013, according to one source.

See also

List of Kosmos satellites (2251–2500)
List of R-7 launches (2000-2004)
2002 in spaceflight
List of Oko satellites

References

Kosmos satellites
Spacecraft launched in 2002
Spacecraft which reentered in 2013
Oko
Spacecraft launched by Molniya-M rockets